Ingeborg Hanreich Verlag is an Austrian publisher located in Vienna. It was established in 1994, originally publishing books on infant nutrition. Beginning in 2009, the company began publishing books on art and music, and in 2012 began publishing children's fiction.

Awards 
The children's book Frau Bertas ganz persönlicher Frühling won an ACUTE award for excellent fairy tale.

References 

Book publishing companies of Austria
Publishing companies established in 1994
Austrian companies established in 1994